Bill McPherson (October 24, 1931 – March 17, 2020) was an American professional football coach in the National Football League (NFL). He was the San Francisco 49ers defensive coordinator from 1989 to 1993.  He was a coach or front office executive in the 49ers organization from 1979 to 2005 and won five Super Bowls.

McPherson was most known for his ability to coach the defensive line, serving as coach of that position for Santa Clara University (1963–1974), UCLA (1975–1977), Philadelphia Eagles (1978), and San Francisco 49ers (1979–1991, 1994–1998).  While with Santa Clara, he also served as linebackers coach and associate head coach.

His son, Pat, is the tight ends coach for the Seattle Seahawks. McPherson died on March 17, 2020, at the age of 88.

References

1931 births
2020 deaths
Philadelphia Eagles coaches
San Francisco 49ers coaches
Santa Clara Broncos football coaches
Santa Clara Broncos football players
UCLA Bruins football coaches
High school football coaches in California
Bellarmine College Preparatory alumni
Coaches of American football from California
Players of American football from San Jose, California